Cinapse is an English-language blog dedicated to movie reviews, home video reviews, editorials, interviews, film discovery and appreciation. It was founded by Ed Travis and David Delgado in February 2013.

Cinapse has over 15 staff members, some of whom also contribute to other film publications such as Ain't It Cool News, Chud, ScreenCrush, Film School Rejects, Geekadelphia, Hollywood Jesus, Screenfish, Slaughter Time, and Rupert Pupkin Speaks.

References

External links
Official Website

American film websites
Internet properties established in 2013